David John Klug (born May 17, 1958) is a former professional American football linebacker in the National Football League (NFL) who played for the Kansas City Chiefs. He played college football at Concordia College (MN).

References 

1958 births
Living people
People from Litchfield, Minnesota
Players of American football from Minnesota
American football linebackers
Concordia Cobbers football players
Kansas City Chiefs players